Flaccid paralysis is a term used in tactical shooting when a headshot is taken and the bullet enters the cranial cavity in the "T-box". T-box shots are normally made in a situation where the suspect is armed and holding a hostage, usually at gun or knife point. The T-zone is roughly a T-shaped area from the outside of one eye socket to the outside of other eye socket and extending down the bridge of the nose to the upper lip. This area forms the "T" from which it derives its name. The bullet strikes and severs the spinal column causing flaccid paralysis and eliminates the possibility of involuntary muscle spasms. 

The advantage of flaccid paralysis is the subject is rendered incapacitated instantaneously preventing involuntary muscle contraction that may pull the trigger or cause other movements that may injure or kill the hostage. This is a difficult shot even by the best marksmen.

References
 "The Military and Police Sniper: Advanced Precision Shooting for Combat and Law Enforcement" by Mike R. Lau

Injuries of head